The Song to the Auspicious Cloud was the title of two historical national anthems of the Republic of China. The first version was composed in 1896 by Jean Hautstont, a Belgian composer and esperantist,  and was in use from 1913 to 1915 as a provisional anthem. The second version, composed by Xiao Youmei, was in use from 1921 to 1928 as an official national anthem. The lyrics of both songs were based on Commentary of Shang Shu written by Fu Sheng in 200–100 BCE.

Auspicious Cloud represents heaven and good luck in Chinese culture.

History
The lyrics of the two versions of the Song to the Auspicious Cloud were based on a song written in Commentary of Shang Shu, which was said to have been sung by the ancient Chinese Emperor Shun, when he passed on the throne to Yu the Great. Its original lyrics in classical Chinese were:

 "How bright is the Auspicious Cloud, How broad is its brilliancy. The light is spectacular with sun or moon, How it revives dawn after dawn."

The image of the song symbolized transfer and changing, which referred to the noble demise system of Chinese emperor relinquishing seats to others in Yao and Shun's era before the hereditary system of monarchy in ancient Chinese legends. After the end of the monarchy and the establishment of the republic, the lyrics of the classical song was favored by many to become the national anthem by the new government.

First version (1913–15)

A national anthem committee was established in July 1912 by Cai Yuanpei, the Minister of Education of the Republic of China. Representative Wang Rongbao (汪榮寶), added another quotation from Emperor Shun: "時哉夫，天下非一人之天下也" (Time has changed, the whole nation is no longer owned by one person.) in the last line of "Song to the Auspicious Cloud" and invited Jean Hautstont, a Belgian composer and esperantist, to compose an anthem. On April 8, 1913, the national anthem was used in opening ceremony of the first regular council. It was a provisional anthem until "China Heroically Stands in the Universe" became the national anthem of the Republic of China on May 23, 1915.

Second version (1921–28)

In November 1919, Duan Qirui established the National Anthem Research Committee (國歌研究會), which adopted the second version of the "Song to the Auspicious Cloud". Lyrics (1920) by Zhang Taiyan from the classic "the Song to the Auspicious Cloud" (卿雲歌) from the Commentary of Shangshu. Music (1921) by Xiao Youmei.

It was selected to be the official anthem on March 31, 1921, by No.759 presidential decree, and was released in July 1921 by the Department of National Affairs (國務院).

¹糺 (jiū "collaborate") is sometimes written as 糾 (jiū "investigate") or 織 (zhī "to web")

It was replaced by the current national anthem of the Republic of China, which is also the Kuomintang party anthem, in 1928, as a result of the Northern Expedition from 1926 to 1928 and the overthrow of the government. However, during the Second Sino-Japanese war, several collaborationist governments established by the Japanese army, such as Provisional Government of the Republic of China and the Reformed Government of the Republic of China, also used this anthem, as these governments recommissioned all the old republican national symbols before the Kuomintang came to power in 1928.

See also 
Historical Chinese anthems
Order of Propitious Clouds

References

External links 
Audio, sheet music, and lyrics

National symbols of the Republic of China (1912–1949)
Historical national anthems
Chinese patriotic songs
Mandarin-language songs
Asian anthems
Book of Documents